Pelee Island  is an island in 
the Canadian province of Ontario. It is located in the western half of Lake Erie. At , Pelee Island is the largest island in Lake Erie and the southernmost populated point in Canada. An Ontario Historical Plaque was erected by the province to commemorate the development of Pelee Island's role in Ontario's heritage. Nearby Middle Island is the southernmost point of land in Canada.

Due to its southerly location and the moderating effect of Lake Erie, it has a slightly milder climate than inland areas. Its climate is one of the mildest in Canada, and the island has been used for vineyards and wine making since 1860, though local wine making died out in the early twentieth century and was restarted in the 1980s by the Pelee Island Winery.

The island is connected to the Canadian mainland and the United States by ferry service. It is a part of an important flyway for migrating birds between Ohio, the Lake Erie islands and Point Pelee. For many years, the island has hosted a fall pheasant hunt which attracts hunters from Canada, the United States and many other countries. The pheasant hunt brings tourist dollars to Pelee at a time of year when virtually no other activities are available, thus generating important revenue in the offseason.

History
Evidence of occupation by indigenous peoples can be dated back 10,000 years through archaeological evidence of projectiles and ceremonial objects. European settlement of the island began in 1788 when the land was leased to Thomas McKee by the Ojibwa and Odawa tribes. William McCormick bought the island in 1823 and the McCormick family settled permanently in 1834. In addition to subsistence agriculture, the island's lumber, stone quarries, and fishing supported inhabitants.  Wine making on Pelee Island began in the 1860s.

Pelee Island features an original 1833 lighthouse that was once used to guide sailors through the rocky Pelee Passage. Lake Erie is full of shipwrecks; Pelee Passage alone contains the remains of at least 15 shipwrecks.

Pelee was the site of a battle during the Patriot War. The Battle of Pelee Island took place along what is now the Michigan-Ontario border in 1838 involving small groups of men on each side of the border seeking to "liberate" Upper Canada from the British.  On February 26, 1838, 300 men captured the island, and on March 3 they were repulsed and either fled the island or were captured.

Geography

Climate
Due to its southerly location and the moderating effect of Lake Erie, it has a slightly milder climate than inland areas. Its climate is one of the mildest in Canada outside of British Columbia, and the island has long been used for vineyards and wine making. It has the longest frost free season in Ontario. It lies within the Carolinian forest region. The island has a humid continental climate (Köppen climate classification Dfa) and falls into the USDA Plant Hardiness Zone 7a. Pelee island and Point Pelee receive the fewest days with precipitation in Ontario, averaging 75 days with measurable precipitation, and drought-like conditions occur every 4–5 years.

Demographics 

Economy

Tourism
Pelee Island is a popular tourist destination, with thousands of visitors each year.  There are several key events such as the Annual Springsong Weekend, a celebration of birds and books, traditionally held on Mother's day weekend, and hosted by famed Canadian author Margaret Atwood. Pelee Island Stone & Sky Music & Art Series feature spoken word, live performance and visual arts weekly for the duration of the summer.   The Stone & Sky Farmer's Market is held every Saturday in the Quarry throughout the summer. The southernmost Chili Cook Off takes place at the Pelee Island Winery Pavilion. The season wraps with the Heritage Weekend, hosted by the Pelee Island Heritage Centre.

Canada Day is celebrated on the island with a fireworks display and a parade along the West Shore Road.

The Pelee Island Half Marathon attracts runners from both the United States and Canada to participate in what is billed as Canada's southernmost and most exclusive half-marathon. Only about 350 runners are allowed to register for the race which is held the first weekend in June.

Ecotourism
Pelee Island has features that make it an ecotourist destination. Pelee is the southernmost inhabited part of Canada and is situated on two major migratory bird routes, the Atlantic Flyway and the Mississippi flyway. The island has been designated as a globally Important Bird Area (IBA) by the Canadian partners of BirdLife International: the Canadian Nature Federation (CNF) and Bird Studies Canada (BSC). IBAs are described as “truly outstanding sites of significance nationally or internationally and sites that are exceptionally important for birds”. Every year the return of the migratory birds is celebrated on Pelee with the Annual Springsong Weekend, usually taking place on Mother's Day weekend. Pelee Island Bird Observatory located on the island work to conserve and study birds on the island, and offers visitors the opportunity to take part in tracking, tagging and photographing the wide variety of species present.

Pelee Island is one of Ontario's most botanically significant sites, and features several Nature Conservancy of Canada areas, and two Provincial Nature Reserves, Lighthouse Point Nature Reserve and Fish Point Nature Reserve.  Glaciation left a variety of habitats for wildlife, such as wetlands, sand dunes, alvars (areas of limestone with a shallow overburden), and deep soils suitable to the trees of the Eastern Deciduous Forest zone. Pelee Island is home to numerous species at risk including both flora and fauna as well as insects, snails, mammals, birds, reptiles, and amphibians.

Government
Pelee Island is part of the Township of Pelee which has its own mayor, deputy mayor, and three councillors. It is a separated township, separate from Essex County. The township comprises nine islands, the largest being Pelee Island, and including Middle Island, Middle Sister Island, Hen Island, Big Chicken Island, Little Chicken Island, Chick Island, East Sister Island, and North Harbour Island.

Infrastructure

Transportation

The island is serviced by two ferries, MV Pelee Islander II and MV Pelee Islander (owned by Pelee Island Transportation Company, a subsidiary of the OSTC). MV Pelee Islander II is the largest passenger ferry along the Lake Erie route to Pelee Island.  The leisurely cruise to Pelee Island can range from one-and-a-half to just over two hours depending on departure routes. The ferry service splits the season between Leamington and Kingsville on the Ontario mainland. Leaving from Leamington from early spring until August, the ferry then finishes the season (mid December) in nearby Kingsville. The ferry from Pelee Island to Sandusky, Ohio runs only from late spring until early fall, while Pelee Islander II runs from the Canadian ports of Leamington and/or Kingsville from early spring until early December. When the ferries are not operating, the only practical way to get to the mainland or to Pelee Island is via airplane. In January 2004, a Cessna 208 Caravan crashed on takeoff from Pelee, killing eight pheasant hunters, the pilot and his girlfriend. The plane crashed into the shallow waters of Lake Erie. It is believed the plane was overloaded and potentially ice-laden according to the Transportation Safety Board of Canada report.

The older MV Pelee Islander, which continues to operate, carries 196 passengers and 14 vehicles. MV Upper Canada, which serviced Pelee prior to Jiimaan, was sent to Lake Huron (the people of Christian Island received her for transport to and from the mainland) when Jiimaan began service to Pelee. Pelee Islander was built at Erieau, Ontario in 1960.

In June 2015, the Ontario Government announced that it would invest $40 million in a new ferry, to replace MV Pelee Islander. A tender was awarded to Asenav of Chile to build the replacement ferry, MV Pelee Islander II, which carries 399 passengers and 34 vehicles.

During the winter season (starting December 11 until the start of the ferry the next year) Pelee Island Transportation Company operates an air service to the Pelee Island Airport from Windsor.

Emergency services
There is a medical clinic on the island operated by the Victorian Order of Nurses. This Nursing Station has regular hours of operation during the summer but does not respond to emergencies. In the event of an emergency, visitors or residents of the island are instructed to call 911. Essex-Windsor EMS are on the Island 365 days a year to provide emergency paramedic services. Air Ambulance services are also available to airlift patients to the nearest hospital if necessary.

The Pelee Island Volunteer Fire Department is present on the Island 365 days a year and responds to 911 calls on the Island; the Department is made up of Fire Chief, a Deputy Fire Chief, and volunteers.

Police services on the island are provided by the Ontario Provincial Police. Officers are present on the island four days a week during the summer, during the annual pheasant hunt in the fall, and on the long weekend in May. During the winter, police will fly to the island to respond to emergency calls only. There are typically two officers on the island at a time. The OPP detachment is located on the second floor of the municipal building.

Education
Pelee Island has one school which is part of the Greater Essex County District School Board and serves students from Junior Kindergarten through grade 8. Children on the island can choose to attend high school on the mainland or they can complete high school courses online with the assistance of the teachers at Pelee Island Public School. The school has a student population of about 10 to 20 pupils at any given time and a staff of two to three teachers.  Classes are held in a traditional three room school house that was built in 1927 and is located at the north west corner of the island.  Every year the children of the school raise money for an annual field trip by holding a raffle during the island's fall pheasant hunt.

See also
List of townships in Ontario

Notes

References

Pelee township, Ontario Statistics Canada

External links

Islands of Lake Erie in Ontario
Landforms of Essex County, Ontario
Municipalities in Essex County, Ontario
Single-tier municipalities in Ontario
Township municipalities in Ontario
Wine regions of Ontario